The University of Mount Olive (UMO or Mount Olive) is a private university in Mount Olive, North Carolina. Chartered in 1951, the university is sponsored by the Original Free Will Baptist Convention and accredited by the Southern Association of Colleges and Schools Commission on Colleges. A member of the NCAA Division II Conference Carolinas, its sports teams compete as the Mount Olive Trojans.

History

Early history and founding
The university's roots and educational philosophy can be traced as early as 1897 when Free Will Baptists in Pitt County, North Carolina, citing a growing need for education in the community, led a discourse on education within the church. These efforts ultimately resulted in the founding of the Free Will Baptist Theological Seminary and its successor institution, Eureka College, both in Ayden, North Carolina, to educate ministers and provide a liberal arts education to the local constituency. After a catastrophic fire destroyed the administration building in 1931, Eureka College ceased operations, and the Free Will Baptist church's efforts to fulfill its educational vision were reinvested in the founding of what is today the University of Mount Olive.

From its inception as a junior college, the University of Mount Olive has been sponsored by the Original Free Will Baptist Convention. The institution was chartered in 1951 and opened in 1952 at Cragmont Assembly, the Free Will Baptist summer retreat grounds near Black Mountain, North Carolina, under the direction of the Reverend Lloyd Vernon. The school was originally called Mount Allen Junior College, taking its name from the mountain near Cragmont.

1953–1970
In September 1953, the college moved to Mount Olive, North Carolina, nearer the center of denominational strength in the eastern region of the state. Under the leadership of the Reverend David W. Hansley, chairman of the board of directors, plans were made to develop a junior college offering programs in arts and sciences and in business. The Reverend W. Burkette Raper was elected president in the summer of 1954, and in September the college began its first collegiate year with an enrollment of twenty-two students.

In 1956, the name "Mount Allen Junior College" was changed to "Mount Olive Junior College". In that same year, plans were launched for an enlarged campus which today consists of 250 acres. In September 1970, the college's name was officially changed to Mount Olive College.

1971–1990
In 1977, the Original Free Will Baptist Convention requested that the board of trustees of Mount Olive College work aggressively toward making the college a four-year institution. The 1979 session of the convention endorsed the projected timetable set by the college's board of trustees to add the junior year in 1984 and the senior year in 1985.

In 1975, the college began an educational program in Goldsboro, North Carolina at Seymour Johnson Air Force Base.

In 1986, the Southern Association of Colleges and Schools Commission on Colleges accredited Mount Olive College as a four-year institution to award associate and baccalaureate degrees.

1991–2008
In the fall of 1994, the transfer of all operations to the main campus was complete and the original downtown campus was sold. In addition to the satellite campuses at New Bern and Seymour Johnson Air Force Base, the college expanded operations to reach non-traditional students at four other locations in North Carolina (Wilmington, Research Triangle Park, Washington, and Smithfield).

In January 1995, the board of trustees selected J. William Byrd as the third president.  Dr. Byrd assumed the duties of office on January 31 and was inaugurated on September 30.

2008-present
In July 2009, an additional location was opened in Jacksonville, North Carolina in 2009, and academic delivery of some of the college's programs became available online in 2012. The same month, Philip P. Kerstetter, Ph.D. was named the college's fourth president. He assumed the duties of office on July 1, 2009, and was inaugurated on March 19, 2010.

Mount Olive College officially changed its name to the University of Mount Olive as of January 1, 2014.

In July 2018, David L. Poole, Ed.D. was named as the university's fifth president.  He assumed the duties of office on July 1, 2018, and was inaugurated on October 5, 2018.

In February 2020, H. Edward Croom, Ed.D. was named the university's interim president.

On September 24, 2020, the Board named Dr. Croom as the sixth President of the University, with the official inauguration on March 25, 2021.

Presidents
The following is a list of the university's presidents:

Campus

The university's main campus is nestled within 250 acres of land at the edge of the Mount Olive Historic District in the town of Mount Olive, NC. The campus is separated by a large common with the university's chapel at its center. Mount Olive is 60 miles southeast of the capital city of Raleigh, North Carolina and 75 miles northwest of the coastal town of Wilmington, North Carolina. The past decade has yielded a period of significant growth and expansion for the main campus. With greater investment in housing and residence halls, academic and recreational buildings, as well as administrative offices.

An additional Education Service Centers is located in Goldsboro on Seymour Johnson Air Force Base.

Academic, recreational, and cultural buildings

 Rodgers Chapel, located in the center of the campus, serves as the primary facility for the university's religious and cultural activities
Alumni Cross Walk, completed in 2000, the cross walk was constructed using bricks from the original campus building in downtown Mount Olive. In the center of the cross walk is the Nido and Mariana Qubein Garden House. The garden house shelters the cornerstone and bell from the original campus
 Henderson Hall, completed in 1965, is the oldest building on what is now the main campus. It is home to faculty offices and classrooms.
 Laughinghouse Hall, houses the department of fine arts.
 J. William and Marvis E. "Marcy" Byrd Building, formerly Mount Olive High School until 1965. Houses the department of music, Hazel Waters Kornegay Historic Assembly Hall, and Byrd Apartments
 Moye Library, completed in 1968.
 W. Burkette and Rose M. Raper Hall (Raper Hall), completed in 2006, houses the Tillman School of Business, the Lois G. Britt Agribusiness Center, and the Department of Science and Mathematics. Included in this building are the Mount Olive Pickle Conference Center and Southern Bank Auditorium
Holmes and Lois K. Murphy Center, houses the dining hall, meeting facilities, and Student Development
 Kornegay Arena, contains classrooms for physical education and athletics facilities for the campus and community
 Pope Wellness Center, is an expansion to the university's athletics and fitness facilities
 Donnie and Linda Lassiter Agricultural Campus
 Dr. H. Don Scott Outdoor Classroom
 The George R. Kornegay, Jr. Student Farm

Administrative buildings
 Communications Building, completed in 2006, is home to the information technology infrastructure and delivery systems that link all of the university's locations together.
 Poole Administration Building, houses the offices of the president, admissions and financial aid, and bookstore.
 Waylin Centre, houses online admissions, human resources, recreation and leisure studies, and the registrar's pffice.
 Goodson and Wells Building, houses facilities maintenance and agricultural mechanics shop
 Academic Affairs Building

Residence halls
Juniors and seniors can choose to live off campus or in the residence halls designated for upperclassmen, but all freshman and sophomores in the university's traditional program must live in campus housing for their first two years at the university. The university's residence facilities can accommodate up to 650 students. 

 Annie Mae Whitfield Hall and Everett Edwin Herring Hall, completed in 2009, the complex provides apartment accommodations for mostly upperclassmen.
 College Apartments, housing provided to upperclassmen who meet specified criteria, accommodates 56 residents.
 King-Hart-Griffin Residence Halls Complex, the women's freshman residence halls complex, houses 130 students.
 Grantham Hall, the men's freshman residence hall, houses 126 students.
 The Inn Residence Hall houses 137 residents and offers housing for males and females.
 J. William and Marvis E. "Marcy" Byrd Apartment Complex, provides accommodations to students in both one- and two-bedroom apartments. Originally built in 1925, the facility is listed under the National Register of Historic Places.
 The Kerstetter Commons (formerly Station Street Commons) was started in 2015 and completed in the Fall of 2018. Kerstetter Commons features apartment style housing with full kitchen amenities, and is housed in 3 buildings: A, B, and C.

Recent renovations and expansions

2017
Two additional residence halls in the Station Street Commons complex were constructed to provide residence for additional students.

2018
The expansion of Rodgers Chapel, now 6,000 square feet, forms a pivotal campus landmark. New construction added classrooms, faculty and staff offices for the Department of Religion, including the Barrow Chair and the Campus Chaplain, and the Office of Church Relations. A prayer garden in the center of the new space provides a place for mediation and reflection.

Organization and administration
The University of Mount Olive educates over 4,000 students per year. It is governed by a 30-member board of trustees with five members being elected each year to a six-year term. At least 18 of the trustees are members in good standing in churches affiliated with the  Original Free Will Baptist Convention. The president of the convention serves as an ex officio member of the board.

Athletics
The University of Mount Olive is a member of NCAA Division II and the Conference Carolinas. The university has intercollegiate teams in the women's sports of lacrosse, track and field, volleyball, cross country, soccer, basketball, tennis, golf, field hockey, and softball as well as in the men's sports of lacrosse, track and field, volleyball, cross country, soccer, basketball, tennis, golf, wrestling, and baseball. Cheerleading is offered as a co-ed sport.

The 2008 Trojans baseball team won the NCAA Division II Baseball National Championship.  UMO has also been awarded the Hawn Cup for best athletic performance in the conference three times.

Athletic facilities
 Ray McDonald, Sr. Complex (Track and Field, Lacrosse, Field Hockey)
 Numerous athletic practice fields
 Nancy Chapman Cassell Field (Softball) and Softball Fieldhouse 
 Scarborough Field (Baseball) and Moore-Williams Fieldhouse
 Ray and Chris Amon Field (Soccer)
 John Neal Walker Tennis Center
 Bundy Fieldhouse (Soccer and Tennis)
 Big Rock Tournament Field House (Men's and Women's Lacrosse)
 Kornegay Arena (Basketball, Volleyball, Wrestling)

Academics 
The university is organized into three schools: the Robert L. Tillman School of Business, the School of Arts & Sciences, and the School of Agriculture and Biological Sciences.

Rankings
The University of Mount Olive's status shifted from a regional baccalaureate college to a regional university in 2019, causing a drop in ranking across the board. The university rankings table reflects the most recent rankings while the tabular shows historical rankings.

Library system
Moye Library is named for Reverend and Mrs. J. C. Moye who were active in the Free Will Baptist denomination. In 2006, the library facilities were expanded with the completion of the companion Communications Building. The first floor of the facility houses the reference desk, reference collection, periodicals collection, the Everett Room, the Sawyer Room, and most staff offices. The Circulation Desk is located on the first floor of the main lobby joining the Communications Building and Moye Library. 

The library's special collections include:
 The Free Will Baptist Historical Collection, a separate library on the history of the Free Will Baptist denomination.
 The University Archives Collection, dedicated to the preservation of materials of and about the university for use by the general public.
 The Jacques Hnizdovsky Collection, a collection of woodcuts and other prints by the Ukrainian artist, Jacques Hnizdovsky.  This is the largest collection of his works in the world.

In addition to the facilities and resources provided directly to its student and faculty population, Moye Library has established cooperative agreements with libraries (both academic and public) in the surrounding areas to allow resources subject to their local regulations. Current cooperative agreements have been established with the following institutions:
 Barton College
 CamelCat
 Campbell University
 East Carolina University
 NC Justice Academy
 North Carolina State University
 Old Dominion University
 UNC Coastal Library Consortium
 Wayne Community College
 Wayne County Public Library

Campus life

Student organizations 
The University of Mount Olive offers a wide variety of student organizations, including arts and culture organizations, performance groups, sports groups, and religious organizations.

Campus Activity Board (CAB)
The Campus Activity Board is responsible for planning activity events on the campus. This student led group is advised by the director of student activities and works hard to provide weekly programs for the campus. On-campus events have included hypnotist, comedians, concerts, bingo, trivia night, carnivals, and sponsored trips that have visited: Orlando, New York City, Costa Rica, Great Britain, France, and Italy.

Student government
A single governing body represents students at Mount Olive:
Student Government Association (SGA)

Religious life
While the University of Mount Olive is affiliated with the Original Free Will Baptist Church, it welcomes students of other faiths and denominations. The university was principally founded on providing an education that allowed students to explore their faith through a liberal arts education.

Songs

Alma mater
The alma mater, written by Daniel W. Fagg, Jr., former academic dean and professor of social sciences, and set to music by Eugene S. Mauney, professor of music, was first published in the college's annual yearbook Olive Leaves in 1958.

Notable alumni

Academia

 Nido Qubein '66 – Motivational speaker and president of High Point University

Business
 Kenney Moore '83 – founder and chief executive officer of Hwy 55 Burgers Shakes & Fries
 Robert L. Tillman '62 – chairman of the board and chief executive officer of Lowe's Companies, Inc.

Sports
 Carter Capps '11 – professional baseball player
Jo Kurino '02 – professional basketball player and coach
 Tom Layne '07 – professional baseball player
 Troy Magorien ‘20-‘20 - Pro NVA
Justin Melton '09 - professional basketball player
 Steve Mintz '90 – professional baseball player
Mike Moore '16 - professional basketball player
 Kodi Whitley – professional baseball player
 Bruce Zimmermann '17 – professional baseball player

Notable faculty

Jill Bullitt – professor of fine art
Robert M. Price – professor of religion
David Rigsbee – professor of poetry
Charles Orville Whitley – taught business law and later became a U.S. Congressperson

References

External links 
 
 Official athletics website

Liberal arts colleges
Universities and colleges accredited by the Southern Association of Colleges and Schools
University of Mount Olive
Educational institutions established in 1951
Education in Wayne County, North Carolina
Buildings and structures in Wayne County, North Carolina

1951 establishments in North Carolina